The 1969–70 Botola is the 14th season of the Moroccan Premier League. FAR Rabat are the holders of the title.

References

Morocco 1969–70

Botola seasons
Morocco
Botola